Arthur Harry Brightwell (born 4 August 1932) was a member of the House of Commons of Canada from 1984 to 1993. He was a veterinarian by career.

Born in Matheson, Ontario, he attended the Ontario Veterinary College in Guelph, Ontario where he graduated in 1956.

He campaigned in the 1984 federal election where he won the Perth electoral district for the Progressive Conservative party. He served there for the 33rd Canadian Parliament.

When riding boundaries were altered in 1987, Brightwell campaigned in the Perth—Wellington—Waterloo electoral district in the following 1988 federal election. He was re-elected, but by a slim two percent margin over Liberal candidate Mike Stinson. After serving in the 34th Canadian Parliament he lost the riding to John Richardson of the Liberal Party in the 1993 federal election.

Electoral record

References

External links

1932 births
Living people
Members of the House of Commons of Canada from Ontario
People from Cochrane District
Progressive Conservative Party of Canada MPs
University of Guelph alumni